This is a list of seasons completed by the Wisconsin Badgers men's basketball program since the team's inception in 1898.

Seasons

  Soderberg coached the last 26 games of the 2000-01 season, going 16–10. Bennett, who started the season as head coach before retiring, went 2–1.
  Gard coached the last 23 games of the 2015-16 season, going 15–8. Ryan, who started the season as head coach before retiring, went 7–5.

Notes

Wisconsin
Wisconsin Badgers men's basketball seasons
Wisconsin Badgers basketball seasons